"Metropolitan Open Land" or "MOL" is a term or designation used only within London. Land designated MOL is afforded the same level of protection as the Metropolitan Green Belt. Designation is intended to protect areas of landscape, recreation, nature conservation and scientific interest which are strategically important. Any alterations to the boundary of MOL should be undertaken by boroughs through the LDF process, in consultation with the Mayor of London and adjoining authorities.

Detailed criteria for designation

In more detail, land designated as MOL should satisfy at least one of the following criteria:

land that contributes to the physical structure of London by being clearly distinguishable from the built-up area
land that includes open-air facilities, especially for leisure, recreation, sport, arts and cultural activities and tourism which serve the whole or significant parts of London
land that contains features or landscapes of historic, recreational, nature conservation or habitat interest, of value at a metropolitan or national level
land that forms part of a Green Chain and meets one of the above criteria.

Role of Mayor of London

The Mayor of London has formally stated that he will, and believes boroughs should, maintain the protection of Metropolitan Open Land (MOL) from inappropriate development. Any alterations to the boundary of MOL should be undertaken by boroughs through the DPD ("Development Plan Document") process, in consultation with the mayor and adjoining authorities.

References 

Regional planning in London